John Pringle may refer to:

John Pringle, Lord Haining (c. 1674–1754), Scottish landowner, judge and politician, shire commissioner for Selkirk 1702–07, MP for Selkirkshire 1708–29, Lord of Session
Sir John Pringle, 1st Baronet (1707–1782), Scottish physician, and President of the Royal Society
John Pringle (died 1792) (c. 1716–1792), son of Lord Haining, Scottish landowner and politician, MP for Selkirkshire 1765–86
 John Pringle (1796–1831) of Haining, Scottish politician, MP for Lanark Burghs 1819–20
John James Pringle (1855–1922), British dermatologist
John Pringle (baritone) (born 1938), Australian baritone
John Pringle (geologist) (1877–1948), Scottish geologist
John Abbott Pringle (1892–1962), Ontario farmer, merchant and political figure
John Douglas Pringle (1912–1999), Scottish-Australian journalist
John Quinton Pringle (1864–1925), Scottish painter
John Wallace Pringle (1863–1938), Chief Inspecting Officer of the Railways Inspectorate
John William Sutton Pringle (1912–1982), British zoologist
Sir John Pringle, 2nd Baronet (1662–1721) of the Pringle baronets
Sir John Pringle, 5th Baronet (1784–1869) of the Pringle baronets
 John Cecil Pringle, American actor, better known as John Gilbert (1899–1936)
 Major General John Pringle (British Army officer) (1774–1861)
John Pringle (biologist), American biologist

See also
John Pringle Nichol (1804–1859), Scottish educator, astronomer and economist
John Douglas Pringle Award or British Prize for Journalism